Mixed-race, mulatto, mestizo, quadroon, griffe, or multiracial Dominicans are Dominican people of mixed racial ancestry. Representing 73.9% of the Dominican Republic's population, they are the majority in the country.

Mixed Dominicans are the descendants from the racial integration between the White Europeans, Native Americans, and later the Africans. They have a total population of approximately 8 million.

The Dominican Republic was the site of the first European settlement in the Americas, the Captaincy General of Santo Domingo founded in 1493. After the arrival of Europeans and the founding of the colony, African people were imported to the island. The fusion of European, native Taino, and African influences contributed to the development of present-day Dominican culture.

History

Native peoples 

Prior to European colonization the inhabitants of the island were the Arawakan-speaking Taíno, a seafaring people who moved into Hispaniola from the north-east region of South America, displacing earlier inhabitants, c. AD 650. The native Tainos divided the island into several chiefdoms and engaged in farming, fishing, as well as hunting, and gathering.

The Spaniards arrived in 1492. Columbus and his crew were the first Europeans to encounter the Taíno people. Columbus described the native Taínos as a physically tall, and well-proportioned people, with a noble character. After initially amicable relationships, the Taínos fought against the conquest, led by the female Chief Anacaona of Xaragua and her ex-husband Chief Caonabo of Maguana, as well as Chiefs Guacanagaríx, Guamá, Hatuey, and Enriquillo. The latter's successes gained his people an autonomous enclave for a time on the island. Within a few years after 1492 the population of Taínos had declined drastically, due to warfare and intermixing. Census records from 1514 reveal that at least 40% of Spanish men in Santo Domingo were married to Taino women, and many present-day Dominicans have significant Taíno ancestry.

European colonization 
Christopher Columbus arrived on the island in December 5, 1492, during the first of his four voyages to the Americas. He claimed the land for Spain and named it La Española due to its diverse climate and terrain which reminded him of the Spanish landscape. In 1496, Bartholomew Columbus, Christopher's brother, built the city of Santo Domingo in the southern coast of the island. The colony became a military base of Spanish conquistadors for the further Spanish conquest of the Americas and the first seat of Spanish colonial rule in the New World. For centuries the colony fought against British, Dutch, and French expeditions into the region until the 17th century when pirates working for the French Empire took over part of the west coast. After decades of armed conflicts, Spain ceded the western third of Hispaniola to France in the Treaty of Ryswick.

In the 1700s Santo Domingo's exports soared and the island's agricultural productivity rose. The population was bolstered by European emigration from the Canary Islands, resettling the northern part of the colony in the Cibao Valley. 
During this period, the privateers of Santo Domingo sailed into enemy ports looking for ships to attack, thus disrupting commerce between Spain's enemies in the Atlantic. 
Dominicans in the service of the Spanish Crown captured British, Dutch, French and Danish ships in the Caribbean Sea throughout the 18th century.  The revenue acquired in these acts of piracy was invested in the economic expansion of the colony. Numerous captive Africans were also taken from enemy slave ships in West Indian waters. The population of Santo Domingo grew to approximately 125,000 in the year 1791. Of this number, 40,000 were white landowners, about 70,000 were of multiracial origin, and some 15,000 were black slaves.

Genetic ancestry and DNA testing

According to recent genealogical DNA studies of the Dominican population, the genetic makeup is predominantly European and Sub-Saharan African, with a lesser degree of Native American ancestry. The average Dominican DNA is estimated to be 57% White European, 8% Native and 35% African overall.

The majority of the Dominican population is tri-racial, with nearly all mixed race individuals having Taíno Native American ancestry along with European and African ancestry. European ancestry in the mixed population typically ranges between 50% and 60% on average, while African ancestry ranges between 30% and 40%, and the Native ancestry usually ranges between 5% to 10%. European and Native ancestry tends to be strongest in the north-central Cibao region, and generally in the mountainous interior of the country. African ancestry is strongest in coastal areas, the southeast plain, and the border regions.

Culture
Carnival celebrations are held in the Dominican Republic each February with parades, street dancing, food festivals, and music. Festivities also take place in the week leading up to Easter Sunday. Parades, beauty pageants, and different festivals in each town throughout the country fill the week. In June the country celebrates Espíritu Santo to honor the island's multi-ethnic heritage with nationwide festivals featuring traditional music.

Concerts, dance troupes, arts and crafts booths, and chefs also celebrate Dominican heritage with an annual cultural festival in Puerto Plata each June. Fiesta Patria de la Restauración, or Restoration Day, celebrates the Dominican Republic's day of independence from Spain, which occurred in 1863. Nationwide events include parades, music festivals, street festivals, and food festivals.

Music

Musically, the Dominican Republic is known for the creation of multiple musical styles and genres but is mostly recognized for merengue, a type of lively, fast-paced rhythm and dance music based on a mixture of European and African musical elements of drums, brass, piano, chorded instruments, and traditionally the accordion, as well as some elements unique to the Dominican Republic, such as the tambora and güira. Its syncopated beats use Latin percussion, brass instruments, bass, and piano or keyboard. Between 1937 and 1950 merengue music was promoted internationally by Dominican groups.

Bachata, a form of music and dance that originated in the countryside and rural neighborhoods of the Dominican Republic, has become quite popular in recent years. Bachata is mainly derived  from Spanish guitar music, with some African and Native influences. It is closely related to the pan-Latin American romantic style called bolero. Over time, it has also been influenced by merengue and by a variety of Latin American guitar styles.

Sports 

Baseball is by far the most popular sport in the Dominican Republic. After the United States, the Dominican Republic has the second-highest number of Major League Baseball (MLB) players. Ozzie Virgil, Sr. became the first Dominican-born player in the MLB on September 23, 1956. Juan Marichal is the first Dominican-born player in the Baseball Hall of Fame.

The highest paid baseball players of all time Alex Rodriguez, Albert Pujols, and Juan Soto are of Dominican descent. In 2013, the Dominican team went undefeated en route to winning the World Baseball Classic.

See also

Dominican American
List of Dominican Americans
Dominicans in Spain
Culture of the Dominican Republic
Demographics of the Dominican Republic
History of the Dominican Republic
White Dominicans

References